Schweidler is a German surname. Notable people with the surname include:

Dick Schweidler (1914–2010), American football player
Egon Schweidler (1873–1948), Austrian physicist
Max Schweidler (1885–?), German art restorer
Walter Schweidler (born 1957), German philosopher

See also
Schmeidler

German-language surnames